Uppstad is a village in Valle municipality in Agder county, Norway. The Norwegian National Road 9 runs past the village. The villages of Brokke, Hovet, and Rysstad lie a short distance to the south.

References

Villages in Agder
Valle, Norway